David Mitchell is a former Australian rules footballer, who played for the Fitzroy Lions in the AFL, which was then known as the VFL.

Career
Mitchell played four games for Fitzroy in the 1986 season, scoring two goals.

References

External links
 
 

Fitzroy Football Club players
Australian rules footballers from Victoria (Australia)
1964 births
Living people